OTSEM (Old Testament Studies: Epistemologies and Methods) is a research network of several Northern European universities. Originally Nordic-German in nature, it now includes British universities as well, which gives it a Nordic-German-Anglo profile. The organization focuses on research into the Hebrew Bible and promotes the development of young scholars in particular, especially through annual seminars and special lectures. Though encompassing theological faculties and using the term Old Testament, OTSEM is non-confessional, with members from Christian (both Protestant and Catholic), Jewish, Muslim, and secular backgrounds.

Institutions

Currently, OTSEM consists of sixteen institutions from eight different countries:

 Denmark: University of Copenhagen, Aarhus University
 Estonia: University of Tartu (affiliated through Helsinki)
 Finland: University of Helsinki, Åbo Akademi University
 Germany: University of Göttingen, University of Hamburg
 Iceland: University of Iceland
 Great Britain: University of Oxford, King's College London, University of Edinburgh
 Norway: University of Oslo, MF Norwegian School of Theology, VID Specialized University
 Sweden: Uppsala University, Lund University

History

The history of OTSEM divides into three distinct periods: Proto-OTSEM, OTSEM I, and OTSEM II (the present iteration).

Proto-OTSEM

OTSEM's antecedents reach back to the 1970s. At that time, Helsinki and Göttingen had a student and professor exchange between their theological faculties. Beginning in the 1990s, bi- and trilateral doctoral seminars took place among the various institutions that would later become members of OTSEM.

 1994: Helsinki visited Hamburg (where current Göttingen affiliates previously were)
 1995: Aarhus visited Hamburg
 1996: Hamburg visited Aarhus
 1997: Lund visited Hamburg
 1998: Hamburg visited Lund
 2000: Göttingen visited Lund
 2001: Lund and Oslo visited MF 
 2002: MF visited Göttingen
 2003: Lund, Göttingen, and Oslo visited MF

In addition to arranging doctoral seminars, future members also organised professorial exchanges.

 1995: Hamburg visited Aarhus
 1998: Lund visited Aarhus
 1999: Helsinki visited Göttingen; Aarhus visited Lund and MF; Lund visited MF
 2000: Helsinki visited Göttingen; Göttingen visited Lund; Lund visited MF; MF visited Lund
 2001: Lund visited MF; Helsinki visited MF

OTSEM I

From 2004 through 2008, the Nordic Council (NordForsk) co-funded the research network. In this period, OTSEM saw formalization and expansion. This expansion included an increase in not only the number of members and member institutions but also meetings and individual exchanges. In particular, the now formal organization commenced its annual conferences (Oslo in 2004, Göttingen in 2005, Aarhus in 2006, Helsinki in 2008, and Lund in 2008). With the end of funding from the Nordic Council came the end of OTSEM I and start of OTSEM II.

OTSEM II

Since 2009, OTSEM has been financed solely by its associated institutions. Nevertheless, the research network has continued its annual conference and individual exchanges.

Notable members

OTSEM members with a high international profile have included the following:

John Barton
Fredrik Lindström
Reinhard Gregor Kratz
Nathan MacDonald
Martti Nissinen
Hermann Spieckermann
Hugh G. M. Williamson
Terje Stordalen

References

External links
 OTSEM Homepage at the University of Hamburg

Old Testament
College and university associations and consortia in Europe
Education in Northern Europe
Religious studies